The KBS Drama Awards is an awards ceremony presented by the Korean Broadcasting System (KBS) for outstanding achievements in Korean dramas aired on its network. It is held annually on 31 December. The highest honor of the ceremony is the "Grand Prize", awarded to the best actor or actress of the year.

Categories

Grand Prize (대상), ceremony's highest honor
Top Excellence in Acting Award (최우수상) 
Excellence in Acting Award (우수상) 
Best Supporting Actor/Actress (조연상) 
Best New Actor/Actress (신인연기상) 
Best Young Actor/Actress (청소년 연기상)
Best Actor/Actress in a One-Act/Special/Short Drama (단막극집상)
PD Award, given to the best actor or actress, as determined by PDs
Best Writer (작가상)
Special Award (특별상)
Achievement Award (공로상)
Popularity Award (인기상) 
Netizen Award (네티즌상), given to the actor/actress with the most online votes on KBS' website
Best Couple Award (베스트 커플상), given to the best drama couple/s as voted by the registered users of KBS website

Grand Prize (Daesang)

Achievement Award

Top Excellence in Acting Awards

Best Actor

Best Actress

Excellence in Acting Awards

Best Actor in a Miniseries

Best Actress in a Miniseries

Best Actor in a Mid-length Drama

Best Actress in a Mid-length Drama

Best Actor in a Serial Drama

Best Actress in a Serial Drama

Best Actor in a Daily Drama

Best Actress in a Daily Drama

Best Actor in a One-Act/Special/Short Drama

Best Actress in a One-Act/Special/Short Drama

Best Actor in Drama Special/TV Cinema

Best Actress in Drama Special/TV Cinema

Supporting Awards

Best Supporting Actor

Best Supporting Actress

Newcomer Awards

Best New Actor

Best New Actress

Youth Awards

Best Young Actor

Best Young Actress

PD Award

Best Writer

Popularity Awards

Popularity Award, Actor

Popularity Award, Actress

Netizen Award, Actor

Netizen Award, Actress

Best Couple Award

Special Award

Soundtrack

Best OST

Discontinued awards

Best Actor

Best Actress

Photogenic Award, Actor

Photogenic Award, Actress

PD of the Year

Viewer's Choice Drama

Congeniality Award

See also 

 List of Asian television awards
 SBS Drama Awards
 MBC Drama Awards

References 

 
Korean Broadcasting System original programming
South Korean television awards
Awards established in 1987
Annual events in South Korea
South Korea annual television specials